Andreas "Andi" Grünenfelder (born September 17, 1960). is a former Swiss cross-country skier who competed from 1982 to 1989. He earned a bronze in the 50 km at the 1988 Winter Olympics in Calgary.

Cross-country skiing results
All results are sourced from the International Ski Federation (FIS).

Olympic Games
 1 medal – (1 bronze)

World Championships

World Cup

Season standings

Individual podiums
 2 podiums

Note:  Until the 1994 Winter Olympics, Olympic races were included in the World Cup scoring system.

Team podiums
 1 podium

References

External links
 
 

1960 births
Living people
Swiss male cross-country skiers
Cross-country skiers at the 1984 Winter Olympics
Cross-country skiers at the 1988 Winter Olympics
Olympic medalists in cross-country skiing
Medalists at the 1988 Winter Olympics
Olympic bronze medalists for Switzerland
Olympic cross-country skiers of Switzerland
20th-century Swiss people